Belarus participated in the Eurovision Song Contest 2009 with the song "Eyes That Never Lie" written by Petr Elfimov and Valery Prokhozhy. The song was performed by Petr Elfimov. The Belarusian entry for the 2009 contest in Moscow, Russia was selected through the national final Eurofest 2009, organised by the Belarusian broadcaster National State Television and Radio Company of the Republic of Belarus (BTRC). The national final was a televised production which consisted of a semi-final and a final held on 15 December 2008 and 19 January 2009, respectively. Fifteen competing acts participated in the semi-final where the top five entries as determined by a jury panel qualified to the final. In the final, public televoting selected "Eyes That Never Lie" performed by Petr Elfimov as the winner with 11,475 votes.

Belarus was drawn to compete in the first semi-final of the Eurovision Song Contest which took place on 12 May 2009. Performing during the show in position 4, "Eyes That Never Lie" was not announced among the 10 qualifying entries of the first semi-final and therefore did not qualify to compete in the final. It was later revealed that Belarus placed thirteenth out of the 18 participating countries in the semi-final with 25 points.

Background 

Prior to the 2009 contest, Belarus had participated in the Eurovision Song Contest five times since its first entry in 2004. The nation's best placing in the contest was sixth, which it achieved in 2007 with the song "Work Your Magic" performed by Dmitry Koldun. In 2008, Belarus failed to qualify to the final with the song "Hasta la vista" performed by Ruslan Alekhno.

The Belarusian national broadcaster, National State Television and Radio Company of the Republic of Belarus (BTRC), broadcasts the event within Belarus and organises the selection process for the nation's entry. Since 2004, BTRC has organised a national final in order to choose Belarus' entry, a selection procedure that continued for their 2009 entry.

Before Eurovision

Eurofest 2009 
Eurofest 2009 was the national final format developed by BTRC to select the Belarusian entry for the Eurovision Song Contest 2009. The competition consisted of a semi-final and final held on 15 December 2008 and 19 January 2009, respectively. Both shows were broadcast on the First Channel and Belarus TV as well as online via the broadcaster's official website tvr.by.

Competing entries 
Artists and composers were able to submit their applications and entries to the broadcaster between 5 October 2008 and 20 November 2008. At the closing of the deadline, 126 entries were received by the broadcaster. Auditions were held between 3 and 5 December 2008 at the Youth Variety Theater in Minsk where a jury panel was tasked with selecting up to fifteen entries to proceed to the televised national final. The jury consisted of Anatoly Yarmolenko (chairman of the jury, director of the ensemble Syabry), Inna Afanasieva (singer), Yadviga Poplavskaya (singer), Leonid Shirin (composer), Alexander Mezhenny (choreographer), Vladimir Rylatko (deputy head of the Belarusian Ministry of Culture), Denis Shpitalnikov (head of music and entertainment programmes of BTRC) and Alexander Kapenkin (deputy director of BTRC). Fifteen semi-finalists were selected and announced on 5 December 2008.

Semi-final 
The televised semi-final took place on 15 December 2008 at the BTRC studios in Minsk, hosted by Denis Kurian. The votes of jury members made up of music professionals selected the top five songs to qualify to the final.

Final 
The televised final took place on 19 January 2009 at the Sports Palace in Minsk, hosted by Anastasiya Tikhanovich and 2007 Belarusian Eurovision contestant Dmitry Koldun. Prior to the final, Veter v Golove opted to change their song as the national final rules set by BTRC allowed for the finalists to completely change their candidate songs. Public televoting exclusively selected the song "Eyes That Never Lie" performed by Petr Elfimov as the winner.

In addition to the performances from the competitors, the show featured guest performances by the host Dmitry Koldun, 2008 Belarusian Eurovision contestant Ruslan Alehno and 2008 Ukrainian Eurovision contestant Ani Lorak.

Preparation 
Following Petr Elfimov's victory at Eurofest 2009, the singer's producer Tatyana Kosmacheva stated that "Eyes That Never Lie" would undergo changes for the Eurovision Song Contest. The revamped version of the song was produced at the Finnvox Studios in Helsinki by Mikka Karmila and Tero Kinnunen who worked with the band Nightwish. The official music video, directed by Anastasiya Tikhanovich and filmed at the National Museum of Folk Architecture and Life in Pyrohiv, was released on 26 April.

Promotion 
Petr Elfimov made several appearances across Europe to specifically promote "Eyes That Never Lie" as the Belarusian Eurovision entry. On 18 February, Petr Elfimov performed the revamped version of "Eyes That Never Lie" during the Greek Eurovision national final. On 21 February, Elfimov performed during the Macedonian Eurovision national final Skopje Fest 2009. On 8 March, Elfimov performed during the Ukrainian Eurovision national final. On 4 April, Elfimov completed promotional activities in Armenia where he performed the Russian version of "Eyes That Never Lie", titled "Vzglyad lyubvi", during the Armenian Music Awards 2009. Elfimov had also planned to take part in promotional events in April which was held in London, Amsterdam and Brussels, however, his participation was later cancelled.

At Eurovision

According to Eurovision rules, all nations with the exceptions of the host country and the "Big Four" (France, Germany, Spain and the United Kingdom) are required to qualify from one of two semi-finals in order to compete for the final; the top nine countries from the televoting progress to the final, and a tenth qualifier was determined by the back-up juries. The European Broadcasting Union (EBU) split up the competing countries into six different pots based on voting patterns from previous contests, with countries with favourable voting histories put into the same pot. On 30 January 2009, a special allocation draw was held which placed each country into one of the two semi-finals. Belarus was placed into the first semi-final, to be held on 12 May 2009. The running order for the semi-finals was decided through another draw on 16 March 2009 and Belarus was set to perform in position 4, following the entry from Belgium and before the entry from Sweden.

The two semi-finals and the final were broadcast in Belarus on the First Channel with commentary by Denis Kurian and Alexander Tikhanovich. The Belarusian spokesperson, who announced the Belarusian votes during the final, was Ekaterina Litvinova.

Semi-final 
Petr Elfimov took part in technical rehearsals on 3 and 7 May, followed by dress rehearsals on 11 and 12 May. The Belarusian performance featured Elfimov performing on stage wearing a white leather costume, together with a guitarist and a dancer who stood on a set of steps covered in a white sheet which blazes a long trail. The stage colours were green and white. The performance also featured the use of a wind machine. Elfimov was joined by three on-stage backing vocalists: Anton Toimentsau, Philip Mazurov and Yan Zhenchak. The guitarist and dancer that accompanied Elfimov on stage were Dmitry Mikulich and Ekaterina Matskevich, respectively.

At the end of the show, Belarus was not announced among the 10 qualifying entries in the first semi-final and therefore failed to qualify to compete in the final. It was later revealed that Belarus placed thirteenth in the semi-final, receiving a total of 25 points.

Voting 
The voting system for 2009 involved each country awarding points from 1-8, 10 and 12, with the points in the final being decided by a combination of 50% national jury and 50% televoting. Each nation's jury consisted of five music industry professionals who are citizens of the country they represent. This jury judged each entry based on: vocal capacity; the stage performance; the song's composition and originality; and the overall impression by the act. In addition, no member of a national jury was permitted to be related in any way to any of the competing acts in such a way that they cannot vote impartially and independently.

Below is a breakdown of points awarded to Belarus and awarded by Belarus in the first semi-final and grand final of the contest. The nation awarded its 12 points to Iceland in the semi-final and to Norway in the final of the contest.

Points awarded to Belarus

Points awarded by Belarus

Detailed voting results

References 

2009
Countries in the Eurovision Song Contest 2009
Eurovision